Tulipwood is a shingle style  historic home at 1165 Hamilton Street in the Somerset section of Franklin Township, Somerset County, New Jersey, United States. It was designed by Jacob August Lienau.

History
The land has been owned by the family of Mary Maclay Pentz Williams since 1877. An 8-1/4 acre portion of the original  property  was transferred to Stephen Guion Williams in the last will and testament of Mary Williams on February 28, 1891.

The house, Tulipwood, was built for Stephen Guion Williams of the Williams & Guion Black Star Line family in 1892. It was the third house built on the property. In  1920 Tulipwood became the home of Leigh W. Kimball and his family.    Kimball's grandson, Christopher Lehman was the last resident of Tulipwood before it was bought by Franklin Township, Somerset County, New Jersey in 2003 and transferred to the Meadows Foundation.

Tulipwood, also known as Whitehaven Farms, was added to the National Register of Historic Places on September 9, 2005.

References

Meadows Foundation (New Jersey)
Franklin Township, Somerset County, New Jersey
Houses completed in 1892
Houses on the National Register of Historic Places in New Jersey
Houses in Somerset County, New Jersey
Dutch Colonial Revival architecture in the United States
Shingle Style architecture in New Jersey
National Register of Historic Places in Somerset County, New Jersey
New Jersey Register of Historic Places